Giulio Ciccone (born 20 December 1994) is an Italian cyclist, who currently rides for UCI WorldTeam .

Career

Bardiani–CSF (2016–18)
Ciccone was named in the start list for the 2016 Giro d'Italia, where he won stage 10. At the 2018 Giro d'Italia, Ciccone finished second in the mountains classification, behind overall race winner Chris Froome. Also in 2018, Ciccone won the Giro dell'Appennino and finished second in the inaugural Adriatica Ionica Race.

Trek–Segafredo (2019–present)

At the Giro d'Italia, Ciccone led the mountains classification for all but one stage, winning the jersey with more than twice as many points than the runner-up Fausto Masnada. He finished 16th overall, with a victory on stage sixteen, a finish at Ponte di Legno. After this, Ciccone was named in the startlist for the Tour de France. During the sixth stage to La Planche des Belles Filles, he was part of a breakaway which survived to the finish line. Ciccone managed to take over the race leader's yellow jersey from Julian Alaphilippe despite fading in the final metres of the climb. He held the lead for two days, before Alaphilippe retook the jersey after gaining twenty seconds on the run-in to the finish in Saint-Étienne. Ciccone also held the lead of the young rider classification for four days, ultimately finishing just outside the top thirty placings overall and sixth in the young rider standings.

He competed in the road race at the 2020 Summer Olympics.

During the Tour, Ciccone signed a 12-month extension to his contract, until the end of the 2021 season.

Major results

2014
 1st Trofeo Rigoberto Lamonica
 5th GP Capodarco
 6th Overall Giro della Valle d'Aosta
1st  Mountains classification
 9th Gran Premio di Poggiana
2015
 1st Bassano-Monte Grappa
 1st  Mountains classification, Giro della Valle d'Aosta
 2nd Piccolo Giro di Lombardia
 4th Coppa Collecchio
 6th Overall Tour de l'Avenir
2016
 1st Stage 10 Giro d'Italia
 5th Gran Premio della Costa Etruschi
 6th Overall Settimana Internazionale di Coppi e Bartali
2017
 3rd Pro Ötztaler 5500
 6th Overall Tour of Utah
1st Stage 6
 6th Overall Tour of Austria
2018
 1st Giro dell'Appennino
 1st  Mountains classification, Okolo Slovenska
 2nd Overall Adriatica Ionica Race
 7th Gran Premio di Lugano
 9th Overall Tour of the Alps
 10th Overall Settimana Internazionale di Coppi e Bartali
2019
 Giro d'Italia
1st  Mountains classification
1st Stage 16
 6th Trofeo Laigueglia
 7th Coppa Agostoni
 8th Overall Tour du Haut Var
1st Stage 2
 10th Trofeo Serra de Tramuntana
 Tour de France
Held  after Stages 6–7
Held  after Stages 6–9
2020
 1st Trofeo Laigueglia
 5th Giro di Lombardia
 8th Giro dell'Emilia
 9th Gran Piemonte
2021
 5th Overall Route d'Occitanie
 5th Trofeo Laigueglia
 6th Circuito de Getxo
2022
 1st Stage 15 Giro d'Italia
 7th Japan Cup
 8th Overall Volta a la Comunitat Valenciana
 8th Trofeo Laigueglia
 10th Overall Tirreno–Adriatico
2023
 2nd Overall Volta a la Comunitat Valenciana
1st  Points classification
1st Stage 2
 5th Overall Tirreno–Adriatico

Grand Tour general classification results timeline

References

External links

 
 
 

1994 births
Living people
Italian male cyclists
Italian Giro d'Italia stage winners
Sportspeople from Chieti
Olympic cyclists of Italy
Cyclists at the 2020 Summer Olympics
Cyclists from Abruzzo
21st-century Italian people